O fortunatos nimium sua si bona norint, agricolas translated from Latin means The farmers would count themselves lucky, if they only knew how good they had it (Virgil, The Georgics, book 2, verse 458).

From this expression it is evident the love the poet from Mantua had for the beauty and charm of country life.

In the 19th century, it was the motto of the Maryland State Agricultural Society. It is also referenced in the third chapter of Samuel Butler's 1872 novel Erewhon.

The longer quote is:

O fortunatos nimium, sua si bona norint,
Agricolas, quibus ipsa, procul discordibus armis,
Fundit humo facilem victum justissima tellus!

Which has been translated as "O happy, happy husbandmen, did they but know the blessings they possess, for whom, far from the din of war, the kindly earth pours forth an easy sustenance." The first line of the longer quote appears in Henry Lee III's funeral oration for George Washington (The Father of His Country).

See also
Latin phrases

References

Latin words and phrases
Virgil